NA-89 Mianwali-I is a constituency for the National Assembly of Pakistan.

Area
Isa Khel
Daud Khel
Kalabagh
Some areas of Mianwali Tehsil

Members of Parliament

1970—1977: NW-44 Mianwali-I

1977: NA-60 Mianwali-I

1985: NA-60 Mianwali

1988—2002: NA-53 Mianwali-I

2002-2018: NA-71 Mianwali-I

2018-2023: NA-95 Mianwali-I

Election 2002 

General elections were held on 10 Oct 2002.

Election 2008 

Nawabzada Malik Amad Khan succeeded in the election 2008 and became the member of National Assembly.

Note: PTI boycotted these elections.

Election 2013 

General elections were held on 11 May 2013.

By-election 2013 
Imran Khan, who won this seat in the 2013 general election, also emerged victorious on two other seats. As per Pakistani law, he was only allowed to keep a single seat. Therefore, he vacated this seat, as well as NA-1 (Peshawar-I), and chose to retain NA-56 (Rawalpindi-VII). As a result, a by-election was held on 22 August 2013, which Obaidullah Shadikhel won, and became a member of the National Assembly.

Election 2018 

General elections were held on 25 July 2018.

See also
NA-88 Khushab-II
NA-90 Mianwali-II

References

External links 
Election result's official website

NA-071